Dare, in comics, may refer to:

Dare Comics, a British publisher of comics
Dan Dare, a British comics character who has appeared in the Eagle and 2000 AD
Dan Dare (Fawcett Comics), a Fawcett Comics character

See also
Dare (disambiguation)